Everett Lee "Skeeter" Kell  (October 11, 1929 – May 28, 2015) was a Major League Baseball second baseman. 

The younger brother of Hall of Famer George Kell, Skeeter played college baseball at the Arkansas Razorbacks baseball from 1948–1951. He played one major league season, for the Philadelphia Athletics, splitting time at second base with Cass Michaels and Pete Suder.

References

External links

Obituary

1929 births
2015 deaths
Arkansas Razorbacks baseball players
Baseball players from Arkansas
Cordele A's players
Major League Baseball second basemen
Moultrie A's players
Ottawa A's players
People from Jackson County, Arkansas
Philadelphia Athletics players
Savannah A's players
Savannah Indians players